Marino Illescas Montaño (born 5 May 2001) is a Spanish footballer who plays as a midfielder for Burgos CF Promesas.

Club career
Illescas was born in Écija, Seville, Andalusia, and joined Sevilla FC's youth setup in 2018, from hometown side Écija Balompié. In August 2020, after finishing his formation, he signed for Deportivo Alavés and was assigned to the reserves in Segunda División B.

In 2022, Illescas moved to another reserve team, Burgos CF Promesas in Segunda Federación. He made his first team debut on 15 January of the following year, coming on as a late substitute for Álex Bermejo in a 2–1 Segunda División home win over FC Andorra.

References

External links

2001 births
Living people
People from Écija
Spanish footballers
Footballers from Andalusia
Association football midfielders
Segunda División players
Segunda División B players
Segunda Federación players
Tercera Federación players
Deportivo Alavés B players
Burgos CF Promesas players
Burgos CF footballers